The Man with the Golden Helmet (c. 1650) is an oil on canvas painting formerly attributed to the Dutch painter Rembrandt and today considered to be a work by someone in his circle. The Man with the Golden Helmet is an example of Dutch Golden Age painting and is now in the collection of the Gemäldegalerie, Berlin.

Description 
The picture shows an elderly man in front of a dark background with a striking golden helmet on his head.

The helmet is the dominant subject of the picture thanks to its color and light and the impasto application, against which the half-illuminated face and the dark background become less important.

Attribution
Categorized as a work by Rembrandt for many years, doubts were expressed as to its provenance in 1984 by a Dutch curators' commission specifically created to investigate Rembrandt's works of questionable authenticity.  They made their remarks while viewing the painting in West Berlin.

In November 1985, Berlin-based art expert Jan Kelch announced that important details in the painting's style did not match the style of Rembrandt's known works, and that the painting was probably painted in 1650 by one of Rembrandt's students.

"It is not a fake," Kelch averred.  "It remains a great masterful work."

Documentation      
This painting was documented by Hofstede de Groot in 1915, who wrote:

References 

The Man with the Golden Helmet in the RKD
 The Man with the Golden Helmet, in the Rembrandt Research Project (archived via Wayback machine)

1650s paintings
Paintings by Rembrandt
Paintings in the Gemäldegalerie, Berlin